This is a list of all known Japanese arcade cabinets, also known as "candy cabinets".

The majority are sitdown cabinets, with the occasional upright (Sega Swing, SNK MV25UP-0) and cocktail (Sega Aero Table). Construction is usually of metal and plastic, with wood also being used in earlier cabinets. Colours tend to be light (normally white) and the cabinets do not allow for custom side art. This is in stark contrast to the American/European style cabinets, which are normally upright, constructed entirely of wood, dark in colour and can be completely customised for the game inside.

These cabinets are found almost exclusively within Japan, and were rarely shipped outside of eastern Asia. As a result, none to very little English information is available for the majority, with most being provided by hobbyist or specialist arcade gaming sources

Konami

Windy
The Konami Windy is a sitdown candy cabinet held in high regard by shoot 'em up players. It's notable for its bright pink artwork, the smallest footprint out of all the 29 in monitor cabinets, and one of the best 15/24 kHz monitors available.
Type: Sitdown
Released: 1996
Japanese Name: UINDI
Dimensions: 750 x 905 x 1339 (1699 with marquee) mm
Wiring: JAMMA
Monitor: 29 in, 15/24 kHz
Rotatable: Yes (no rotate mechanism)
Weight: 105 kg

Windy II

The Windy II updated the original Windy with a colour scheme change (blue), a tri-sync monitor, and with a change of I/O to the new JAMMA Video Standard (JVS). Dimensions and weight remain the same, but unfortunately the design also maintained the easily breakable neck of the original cabinet. Konami included a first party adapter to convert the cabinet to the more common JAMMA standard.
Type: Sitdown
Released: 1998
Japanese Name: UINDI II
Dimensions: 750 x 905 x 1339 (1699 with marquee) mm
Wiring: JVS
Monitor: 29 in, 15/24/31 kHz
Rotatable: Yes (no rotate mechanism)
Weight: 105 kg
Notes: Both the Windy cabinets neither have a rotate mechanism nor a monitor frame. As a result of this the monitor is generally kept permanently in either vertical or horizontal orientation. Rotating the monitor requires extreme care – the lack of a frame leaves the fragile neck exposed and easy to snap, rendering the tube useless.

Domy Theater 50
Type: Sitdown
Japanese Name: DOMISHIATA 50
Released: 1996
Dimensions: 1190–1885 x 2400 x 1929 mm
Monitor: 50 in, 15/24 kHz
Rotatable: No
Weight: 275 kg

Domy Jr
Type: Sitdown
Dimensions: 630 x 780 x 1200 mm
Monitor: 26 in
Rotatable: Yes
Standard: JAMMA

Domy Theater 33
Type: Sitdown
Monitor: 33 in
Dimensions: 750 x 980 x 1610 mm
Rotateable: Yes

Plasma
Type: Sitdown
Dimensions: 1200 x 694 x 1775 mm

Sauroid
Type: Upright

Sega
Sega's cabinets are usually designed in their Mechatronics division.

City
Type: Sitdown
Release: 1986
Dimensions: 580 x 715 x 1000 mm
Wiring: JAMMA
Monitor: 19 in, 15 kHz 
Weight: 60 kg
Power: 150 W

Aero City
Type: Sitdown
Release: July-1988
Dimensions: 660 x 955 x 1320 mm
Wiring: JAMMA
Monitor: 26 in, 15/24 kHz
Rotatable: Yes (no rotate mechanism)
Weight: 110 kg
Power: 125 W

Aero Table
Type: Cocktail
Release: 1988
Dimensions: 900 x 900 x 640 (to table top) / 1120 (to marquee top) mm
Wiring: JAMMA
Monitor: 26 in, 15 kHz
Rotatable: Yes (no rotate mechanism)
Weight: 90 kg
Power: 150 W

Astro City

Type: Sitdown
Japanese Name: ASUTOROSHITI
Release: February-1993
Dimensions: 750 x 905 x 1445 mm
Wiring: JAMMA
Monitor: Nanao MS8, 29 in, 15/24 kHz
Rotatable: Yes (no rotate mechanism)
Weight: 93 kg
Power: 140 W

Blast City
Type: Sitdown
Japanese Name: BURASUTOSHITI
Release: October 1996
Dimensions: 760 x 939 x 1643 mm
Wiring: JAMMA
Monitor: 29 in, 15/24/31 kHz
Rotatable: Yes (no rotate mechanism)

New Astro City
Type: Sitdown
Released: 1995
Dimensions: 750 x 905 x 1445 mm
Wiring: JAMMA
Monitor: Nanao MS9, 29 in, 15/24 kHz
Rotatable: Yes (no rotate mechanism)

Astro City II
Type: Sitdown
Released: 1997
Dimensions: 770 x 1040 x 1450 mm
Wiring: JAMMA
Monitor: Nanao, 29 in, 15/24 kHz
Rotatable: Yes (no rotate mechanism)

Super Megalo
Type: Sitdown
Dimensions: 1140 x 2250 x 1867 mm

Super Megalo 2
Type: Sitdown
Released: June 1994
Dimensions: 1140 x 3100 x 1867 mm
Monitor: 50 in, 15/24 kHz
Weight: 330 kg

Megalo 410
Type: Sitdown
Released: July 1996
Dimensions: 890 x 1180 x 1630 mm
Monitor: 41 in, 15/24/31 kHz
Wiring: JAMMA
Weight: 134 kg
Power: 354 W
Rotatable: No

Megalo 50
Type: Sitdown
Dimensions: 1230 x 2260~3200 x 1880 mm
Monitor: 50 in, 15/24 kHz
Wiring: JAMMA
Rotatable: No
Weight: 378 kg
Power: 301 W

Naomi Deluxe Universal
Type: Sitdown
Released: 2005
Dimensions: 1054 x 1981 x 2144 mm
Monitor: 38 in
Wiring: JVS
Rotatable: No
Weight: 308 kg

Naomi 50 Universal
Type: Sitdown
Dimensions: 1150 x 2130 x 2015 mm
Monitor: 50 in
Rotatable: No
Wiring: JVS
Weight: 258 kg

Versus City
Type: Sitdown
Japanese Name: VASASUSHITI
Released: January 1996
Dimensions: 750 x 1834 x 1950 mm
Monitor: 29 in, 15/24 kHz
Wiring: JAMMA
Rotatable: No

New Versus City
Type: Sitdown
Japanese Name: NEW VASASUSHITI
Released: November 1996
Dimensions: 750 x 1834 x 1678 mm
Rotatable: Yes

Swing
Type: Upright
Released: 1991
Dimensions: 880 x 995 x 1980 mm
Wiring: JAMMA
Monitor: 26 in, 15/24 kHz
Rotatable: Yes
Weight: 125 kg
Power: 125 W

Naomi Universal
Type: Sitdown/Upright
Released: March 1999 
Dimensions: Sitdown – 760 x 980 x 1750 mm Upright: 760 x 968 x 2030 mm
Wiring: JVS
Monitor: 29 in, 31 kHz
Rotatable: Yes
Weight: 117 kg
Power: 322 W

Net City
Type: Sitdown/Upright
Released: December 1999 
Dimensions: Sitdown – 760 x 980 x 1750 mm Upright: 760 x 968 x 2030 mm
Wiring: JVS
Monitor: 29 in, 15/24/31 kHz
Rotatable: Yes
Weight: 117 kg
Power: 322 W

New Net City
Type: Sitdown/Upright
Dimensions: Sitdown – 760 x 980 x 1750 mm Upright: 760 x 968 x 2030 mm
Wiring: JVS
Monitor: 29 in, 15/24/31 kHz
Rotatable: Yes
Weight: 117 kg
Power: 322 W

Lindbergh Universal
Type: Sitdown/Upright
Released: 2007
Dimensions: 820 x 827 x 1800 (2100 with marquee) mm
Monitor: 32 in widescreen, 31–60 kHz
Wiring: JVS
Rotatable: No
Weight: 122 kg
Power: 460 W

Jaleco

Table Pony
Type: Cocktail

Table Pony 25
Type: Cocktail
Wiring: JAMMA
Monitor: 25 in, 15 kHz
Dimensions: 625 x 860 x 670 mm
Rotateable: No
Weight: 59.5 kg
Power: 82 W

Table Pony 25 VH
Type: Cocktail
Wiring: JAMMA
Monitor: 25 in, 15 kHz
Dimensions: 625 x 860 x 770 mm
Rotateable: Yes
Weight: 71 kg
Power: 130 W

Pony
Type: Sitdown

Pony Mark II 19
Type: Sitdown
Released: 1996
Monitor: 19 in
Dimensions: 560 x 650 x 1050 mm

Pony Mark II 27
Type: standup
Released: 1992

Pony Mark III
Type: Sitdown
Released: 1997

Pony Mark IV
Type: Sitdown
Dimensions: 860 x 730 x 1360 mm
Rotateable: Yes
Wiring: JAMMA

Pony Mark V
Type: Sitdown

Pony 40
Type: Sitdown
Dimensions: 1140 x 2120 x 1755 mm
Weight: 160 kg
Monitor: 42 in
Power: 330 W

Irem

Madonna
Type: Sitdown
Dimensions: 620 x 840 x 1320 mm
Weight: 100 kg
Monitor: 25 in 15/24 kHz
Rotatable : Yes (no easy rotation)
Power: 120 W

Madonna 33
Type: Sitdown

Capcom

BGS-25
Type: Sitdown
Dimensions: 800 x 965 x 1435 mm
Note: Usually called the Capcom Q25

Impress
Type: Sitdown
Monitor: 29 in, 15 kHz
Dimensions: 730 x 920 x 1460 mm
Weight: 110 kg
Power: 150 W

Cute
Type: Sitdown
Dimensions: 500 x 690 x 1300 mm
Wiring: JAMMA
Rotation : Yes, it's proved
Weight: 60 kg

Status 18
Type: Sitdown
Dimensions:  560 x 660 x 1105 mm
Monitor: 18 in
Weight: 60 kg

Status 25
Type: Sitdown
Dimensions:  598 x 785 x 1133 mm
Monitor: 25 in
Weight: 70 kg

Playzass
Type: Upright
Dimensions: 760 x 980 x 1750 mm

Captain IV
Type: Upright
Monitor: 29 in
Dimensions: 1870 x 1104 x 1130 mm
Weight: 140 kg
Power: 160 W

CAV 2 OOB 60
Type: Upright
Monitor: 60 in

OOB-50
Type: Sitdown
Dimensions: 1140 x 2200 x 1875 mm
Monitor: 50 in, 15/24 kHz
Wiring: JAMMA
Weight: 270 kg
Power: 350 W

CAV System 60
Type: Sitdown
Dimensions: 2463 x 1500 x 3005 mm
Monitor: 60 in

Sigma

Game Explorer
 Type: Sitdown
 Dimensions: 750 x 1696 x 925
 Monitor: Panasonic 29 in
 Chassis: Toei 15/24/31 kHz
 Wiring: JAMMA/Half JVS
 Weight: 98.5 kg
 Power: 100 W

SNK

Candy 18
Type: Sitdown
Monitor: 18 in
Wiring: JAMMA

Candy 25
Type: Sitdown
Monitor: 25 in
Dimensions: 620 x 790 x 1216 (1486 with marquee) mm
Wiring: JAMMA
Power: 120 W

Candy 26
Type: Sitdown
Monitor: 26 in
Wiring: JAMMA

MV19SC-0
Type: Upright
Monitor: 19 in
Dimensions: 550 x 680 x 1510 mm
Power: 180 W
Wiring: JAMMA/MVS
Weight: 70 kg

MV25TA-0
Type: Cocktail
Monitor: 25 in
Dimensions: 900 x 800 x 1121 (1258 at maximum tilt) mm
Wiring: JAMMA/MVS
Power: 180 W
Weight: 103 kg

MV25U4-0
Type: Upright
Monitor: 25 in
Dimensions: 640 x 920 x 1930 mm
Wiring: JAMMA/MVS
Power: 180 W
Weight: 185 kg

MV25U6-0
Type: Upright
Monitor: 25 in
Dimensions: 810 x 920 x 1930 mm
Wiring: JAMMA/MVS
Power: 180 W
Weight: 200 kg

MV25UP-0
Type: Sitdown
Monitor: 25 in
Dimensions: 680 x 850 x 1724 mm
Wiring: JAMMA/MVS
Power: 180 W
Weight: 103 kg

MVS-U1/33
Type: Sitdown
Monitor: 33 in
Wiring: JAMMA/MVS

MVS-U2
Type: Sitdown
Monitor: 25 in
Dimensions: 620 x 790 x 1266 mm
Wiring: JAMMA/MVS
Power: 120 W
Notes: Became known as an MVS-U2/25 once the larger screen U2's were released.

MVS-U2/29
Type: Sitdown
Monitor: 29 in
Wiring: JAMMA/MVS

MVS-U2/33
Type: Sitdown
Monitor: 33 in
Wiring: JAMMA/MVS

MVS-U4
Type: Sitdown
Monitor: 25 in
Dimensions: 620 x 790 x 1266 mm
Wiring: JAMMA/MVS
Power: 120 W
Notes: Became known as an MVS-U4/25 once the larger screen U4's were released.

MVS-U4/29
Type: Sitdown
Monitor: 29 in
Dimensions: 695 x 870 x 1346 mm
Wiring: JAMMA/MVS
Power: 120 W

MVS-U4/33
Type: Sitdown
Monitor: 33 in
Wiring: JAMMA/MVS

Neo 19
Type: Sitdown
Monitor: 19 in
Dimensions: 520 x 646 x 1340 mm
Wiring: JAMMA/MVS
Weight: 60 kg
Power: 100 W

Neo 25
Type: Sitdown
Monitor: 25 in
Dimensions: 630 x 850 x 1368 mm
Wiring: JAMMA/MVS
Weight: 89 kg
Power: 120 W

Neo 29
Type: Sitdown
Monitor: 29 in
Dimensions: 715 x 958 x 1440 mm
Wiring: JAMMA/MVS
Weight: 108 kg
Power: 120 W

Neo 50
Type: Sitdown
Wiring: JAMMA/MVS

Neo 50 II
Type: Sitdown
Wiring: JAMMA/MVS
Dimensions: 1995 x 800 x 1200 mm

Neo 50 III
Type: Sitdown
Wiring: JAMMA/MVS/HNG
Dimensions: 1146 x 681 x 1900 mm (Monitor section), 960 x 1320 x 902 mm (Monitor section)
Power: 325 W
Weight: 300 kg (Total), 140 kg (Monitor section), 160 kg (Control panel section)

Neo Candy 25
Type: Sitdown
Wiring: JAMMA/MVS
Dimensions: 600 x 890 x 1200 mm

Neo Candy 29
Type: Sitdown
Wiring: JAMMA/MVS

SC14-2
Type: Sitdown
Monitor: 14 in
Dimensions: 420 x 555 x 1224 mm
Wiring: JAMMA/MVS
Power: 75 W

SC19-4
Type: Sitdown
Monitor: 19 in
Dimensions: 510 x 595 x 1282 mm
Wiring: JAMMA/MVS
Power: 100 W

SC25-4
Type: Sitdown
Monitor: 25 in
Dimensions: 600 x 708 x 1414 mm
Wiring: JAMMA/MVS
Power: 120 W

SCB-U4
Type: Upright
Dimensions: 520 x 655 x 1412 mm
Wiring: JAMMA/MVS
Power: 100 W

Super Neo 29
Type: Sitdown
Monitor: 29 in
Wiring: JAMMA/MVS

Super Neo 28 Candy
Type: Sitdown, or standup, vice versus
Released: 1996-97
Monitor: 33 in, 15/25 kHz
Wiring: JAMMA/MVS, kbh, or standard kbh-vhsh
Dimensions: 745 x 897 x 1437 mm

Super Neo 29 Type II
Type: Sitdown
Dimensions: 710 x 890 x 1927 mm (including marquee)
Monitor: 29 in
Wiring: JAMMA/MVS
Power: 200 W
Weight: 102 kg

Video Game
Type: Sitdown
Dimensions: 580 x 750 x 1120 mm

Taito

Canary
Type: Sitdown
Released: 1991
Dimensions: 660 x 805 x 1280 (1710 with marquee) mm
Wiring: JAMMA
Monitor: Nanao MS8, 25 in, 15/24 kHz
Rotation: Yes (no rotate mechanism)

Egret 29
Type: Sitdown
Japanese Name: 29 IGURETTO
Released: 1994
Dimensions: 695 x 794 x 1580 mm
Weight: 95 kg
Monitor: Nanao MS8, 29 in, 15/24 kHz
Rotatable: Yes (rotate mechanism)
Standard: JAMMA

Egret II
Type: Sitdown
Japanese Name: IGURETTO II
Released: 1996
Dimensions: 750 x 903 x 1450 mm (1765 mm including Marquee)
Weight 102 kg
Power 125 W
Monitor: Nanao MS9, 29 in, 15/24 kHz
Rotatable: Yes (rotate mechanism)
Standard: JAMMA

Egret 3
Type: Sitdown
Japanese Name: IGURETTO 3
Released: 2003
Monitor: 29 in, 15/24/31 kHz
Dimensions: 750 x 903 x 1450 mm

Teatro Ex 33
Type: Sitdown
Rotatable: Not by design.

Teatro 50
Type: Sitdown
Monitor: 50 in, 15/24 kHz
Dimensions: 1160 x 2430~3700 x 1900 mm
Weight: 230 kg
Power: 325 W

Hatris
Dimensions: 720 x 410 x 510 mm

MT5
Type: Sitdown
Released: 1989
Dimensions: 750 x 980 x 500 mm

MT2
Type: Sitdown
Released: 1987

Uni
Dimensions: 1995 x 800 x 1200 mm

Vewlix
Type: Sitdown
Dimensions: 798 x 798 x 1570 mm
Monitor: 32in LCD, 720p HD
Rotatable: Yes
Weight: 120 kg
Power: 170 W

Namco

Cyber Lead
Type: Sitdown
Released: 1997
Japanese Name: SAIBARIDO
Dimensions: 760 x 970 x 1480 mm
Wiring: JVS
Monitor: Nanao MS9, 29 in, 15/24 kHz
Rotatable: No
Weight: 120 kg
Power: 120 W

Cyber Lead II
Type: Sitdown
Released: September 2000
Japanese Name: SAIBARIDO II
Dimensions: 760 x 970 x 1480 mm
Wiring: JVS
Monitor: Nanao 15/24/31 kHz
Rotatable: No
Weight: 120 kg
Power: 120 W

Dynalive
Type: Sitdown
Japanese Name: DAINARAIVU
Dimensions: 750 x 905 x 1699 mm

Excelcabinet
Type: Sitdown
Japanese Name: EKUSERUKYABINETTO
Monitor: 25 in

Exceleena 1
Type: Sitdown
Monitor: 29 in
Dimensions: 978 x 940 x 1473 mm

Exceleena 2
Type: Sitdown
Dimensions: 860 x 730 x 1360 mm

Arena Site
Type:Sitdown
Monitor: 50 in

Noir
Type: Sitdown
Released: 2007
Monitor: 32 in

Tecmo

Video Game

Kyotaro
Type: Sitdown

Urban
Type: Sitdown

Sammy

Video World

Atomiswave SD
Type: Sitdown
Released: 2003
Monitor: Wei-Ya 29 in, 15/24/31 kHz
Dimensions: 750 x 903 x 1450 mm
Notes: A rebranded Taito Egret 3

Atomiswave
Type: Upright

Seychelles
Dimensions: 730 x 869 x 1362 mm

Sunsoft

Rana
Type: Sitdown
Monitor: 18 in
Dimensions: 550 x 600 x 1350 mm
Weight: 55 kg
Power 105 W

MSP

Joymax
Silkroad online
Deco Online

Other

AMBO
Type: Sitdown

MAS 25
Type: Sitdown

References

Arcade video games